18 til I Die is the seventh studio album by the Canadian singer-songwriter Bryan Adams. Released on June 4, 1996, by A&M Records, the album became a commercial success peaking at No. 1 in the United Kingdom and No. 2 in his home country Canada. It was recorded on different locations which included Jamaica and France. 18 til I Die featured the number one song "Have You Ever Really Loved a Woman?", which had been released as a single and on the soundtrack to the film Don Juan DeMarco over a year prior, and 4 other singles: "The Only Thing That Looks Good on Me Is You" (the album's second single, released May 28), "Let's Make a Night to Remember", "Star", and "18 til I Die"; the album track "I'll Always Be Right There" was also released to radio in the United States. Adams traveled throughout North America and Europe to promote the album after its June release. Perhaps the most memorable of these concerts was playing to more than 70,000 people at Wembley Stadium in July 1996. The album performed lower than expectations in the US but it sold 5 million copies worldwide.

Music

Recording and production
The album was written and recorded and produced by Adams and R.J. "Mutt" Lange in a house in Ocho Rios, Jamaica, from Winter 1994 to Summer 1995 and in two different houses in Provence, France, from Autumn 1995 to Spring 1996 using the Warehouse Studio Mobile Unit. Even the mix was done in a house in Provence, France, in March 1996 by Bob Clearmountain. Adams played some of these songs live before release; for example, he played "Let's Make a Night to Remember" at a soundcheck in a gig in 1993 during the So Far So Good World Tour. Adams had completed 12 songs by 1995, but felt that something was lacking in the album, and went back and recorded two new songs: "The Only Thing" and "18 til I Die". Adams then named the album 18 til I Die.

Release
18 til I Die was officially released in June 1996. In the United States the album peaked at 31 on the Billboard 200 and held that position for three weeks. In Adams' native Canada, 18 til I Die reached number 4. The album was released in Australia, Europe and New Zealand in late June 1996. The album was a massive commercial success during its release in Europe, reaching number one on the UK Albums Chart, Adams' second in a row. 18 til I Die reached the top ten in the Netherlands, Belgium, Switzerland, Finland, Norway, Austria, Sweden, Germany and Australia, and was a moderate top 20 success in France.

The album was certified platinum in the United States, 18 til I Die was certified three-times platinum in Canada and Australia and two-times platinum in the UK.

18 til I Die included the hit singles "Have You Ever Really Loved a Woman", "The Only Thing That Looks Good on Me Is You", "Let's Make a Night to Remember", "Star", and "18 til I Die", all of which had accompanying music videos. "Have You Ever Really Loved a Woman?" had been the number-one song on the US Billboard Hot 100 for five weeks when originally released in spring 1995, while "Let's Make a Night to Remember", the second single from the album to chart in the United States, peaked at 24 on the Billboard Hot 100 (and number 6 on the adult contemporary chart). The other singles became big hits in Europe. "The Only Thing That Looks Good on Me Is You" was the most successful rock song from 18 til I Die, reaching number 5 on the UK Singles Chart and number 1 on the Canadian Singles Chart. The music video for "The Only Thing That Looks Good on Me Is You" received heavy airplay on music television. In early 1997, the track "I'll Always Be Right There" became the album's final single, reaching number 3 on the U.S. Adult Contemporary chart and number 59 on the Hot 100 Airplay chart.

Album differences
On November 4, 1996, a second Australian version of 18 til I Die was released, featuring the song "I Finally Found Someone" (a duet with Barbra Streisand) in place of "You're Still Beautiful to Me" and had an alternative cover with a purple background and a different track order, while the Japanese version contained the bonus song "Hey Elvis".

Track listing

Personnel 
 Bryan Adams – vocals, 12-string guitar (1), wah guitar (1), harmonica (2), guitar (3, 5, 6, 7, 10), rhythm guitar (4), vocal solo (4), acoustic guitar (8, 12, 13), electric guitar (8), harmony vocals (8, 12, 13), lead guitar (11), handclaps (13)
 Olle Romo – programming, percussion (1-6, 8, 10, 11, 12), acoustic piano (2), keyboards (3, 5, 6, 10, 12), pads (8, 13), castanets (13)
 Michael Kamen – acoustic piano (5), string arrangements (9)
 Keith Scott – guitar (1, 4, 5), lead guitar (2, 3), 12-string guitar (2), 6-string bass (2), electric sitar (3), tremolo guitar (6, 11), guitar licks (8), guitar swells (8), slide guitar (10), rhythm guitar (11), acoustic guitar (12), electric guitar (12)
 Mutt Lange – guitar (1, 3-7, 10, 11), rhythm guitar (2), bass (7, 13), guitar picks (12)
 Phil Palmer – guitars (9)
 Paco de Lucia – Spanish guitar (13)
 Dave Taylor – bass (1-6, 8, 10, 11, 12)
 Mickey Curry – drums (1-8, 10-13), brushes (13)
 La Petite Orchestre De Cannes – strings (9)
 Edward Shearmur – orchestra director (9)
 The Pointless Brothers [Bryan Adams and Mutt Lange] – backing vocals (1, 4, 6, 10, 11)

Production 
 Bryan Adams – producer 
 Robert John "Mutt" Lange –producer (1-7, 9-13)
 Olle Romo – engineer 
 Ron Obvious – technical assistant 
 Bob Clearmountain – mixing 
 Bob Ludwig – mastering 
 Gateway Mastering (Portland, Maine) – mastering location 
 Dirk Rudolph – artwork, additional photography 
 Matthew Rolston – cover photography, additional photography
 Andrew Catlin – additional photography
 Anton Corbijn – additional photography
 Bruce Allen – management

Charts

Weekly charts

Year-end charts

Certifications and sales

See also
 Wembley 1996

Notes

References

Bryan Adams albums
1996 albums
Albums produced by Robert John "Mutt" Lange
A&M Records albums
Soft rock albums by Canadian artists